Trichopetalum is a genus of flowering plants in the family Asparagaceae, subfamily Lomandroideae, native to southern South America.

Species include:

 Trichopetalum chosmalensis Guagl. & Belgrano - Neuquén Province of Argentina
 Trichopetalum plumosum (Ruiz & Pav.) J.F.Macbr. - Chile

References

Asparagaceae genera
Lomandroideae
Flora of southern South America